Cixiini is a planthopper tribe in the family Cixiidae. This tribe is non-monophyletic.

Genera

 Achaemenes)  Stål, 1866 
 Aka  White, 1879 
 Anila  Distant, 1906 
 Ankistru s Tsaur & Hsu, 1991 
 Apartus  Holzinger, 2002 
 Aselgeoides  Distant, 1917 
 Asotocixius  Kramer, 1983 
 Calamister  Kirkaldy, 1906 
 Cermada  Emeljanov, 2000 
 Chathamaka  Lariviere, 1999 
 Chidaea  Emeljanov, 2000 
 Cixiosoma  Berg, 1879 
 Cixius  Latreille, 1804 
 Discophorellus  Tsaur & Hsu, 1991 
 Flachaemus  Van Stålle, 1986 
 Gonophallus  Tsaur & Hsu, 1991 
 Iolania  Kirkaldy, 1902 
 Koroana  Myers, 1924 
 Leades  Jacobi, 1928 
 Leptolamia  Metcalf, 1936 
 Macrocixius  Matsumura, 1914 
 Malpha  Myers, 1924 
 Microledrida  Fowler, 1904 
 Monomalpha  Emeljanov, 2000 
 Nanocixius  Wagner, 1939 
 Neocixius  Wagner, 1939 
 Pachyntheisa  Fowler, 1904 
 Platycixius  Van Duzee, 1914 
 Sardocixius  Holzinger, 2002 
 Semicixius  Tsaur & Hsu, 1991 
 Simplicixius  Holzinger, 2002 
 Sphaerocixius  Wagner, 1939 
 Stegocixius  Kramer, 1983 
 Tachycixius  Wagner, 1939 
 Trirhacus  Fieber, 1875

References 

  
Hemiptera tribes
Cixiinae